Minnis may refer to:

 Stelling Minnis, a village and civil parish

One of several people with the surname Minnis:
 Alastair Minnis (b. 1948), British academic
 Arnold Minnis (1891–1972) English cricketer and military officer
 Chelsey Minnis (b. 1970), American poet
 Helen Minnis, Scottish psychiatrist
 Hubert Minnis (b. 1954), Bahamian politician
 Jack Minnis (footballer) (1922–1975), Australian rules footballer
 Jack Minnis (1926–2005), American civil rights activist
 John Minnis (b. 1953), American politician
 Joseph Minnis (1904–1977), American bishop
 Karen Minnis (b. 1954), American politician
 Michael Minnis, American writer
 Snoop Minnis (b. 1977), American football player
 Tony Minnis, American tennis coach
 William Minnis (b. 1902), Irish chess master